Speyeria coronis, the Coronis fritillary, is a butterfly of the family Nymphalidae of North America. It is common from Baja California to Washington and east to Colorado and western South Dakota and once reported in Alberta.

This butterfly is mostly orange and yellow with distinct dark-brown bars on the topside. The wing margins are dark with lighter circles then dark crescents. Silvery spots predominate on the yellowish underside.

The larvae feed on Viola species.

Similar species
Zerene fritillary – Speyeria zerene
Edwards' fritillary – Speyeria edwardsii

Subspecies
Listed alphabetically:
S. c. halcyone (Edwards, 1869)
S. c. hennei (Gunder, 1934)
S. c. semiramis (Edwards, 1886)
S. c. simaetha dos Passos & Grey, 1945
S. c. snyderi (Skinner, 1897)

References 

Speyeria
Butterflies of North America
Butterflies described in 1864
Taxa named by Hans Hermann Behr